The Pauvres Pass is a 2111 meters high mountain pass located in the municipality of Bex, Switzerland.

References

Mountain passes of Switzerland